Petra Papp (born 22 August 1993) is a Hungarian chess player who holds the FIDE title of Woman Grandmaster (WGM, 2012).

Chess career
In 2009, Papp won the Hungarian Youth Chess Championship in the Under 16 category. She represented Hungary several times in the European Youth Chess Championships and the World Youth Chess Championships. In Iași, she won an individual gold medal and team silver medal in the 2011 European Girls' U18 Team Chess Championship.

In the Hungarian Women's Chess Championships, Papp won gold (2012) and bronze (2009) medals.

Papp played for Hungary in the Women's Chess Olympiads:
 In 2012, at reserve board in the 40th Chess Olympiad (women) in Istanbul (+5, =3, -1),
 In 2014, at reserve board in the 41st Chess Olympiad (women) in Tromsø (+2, =4, -1),
 In 2016, at third board in the 42nd Chess Olympiad (women) in Baku (+2, =6, -0).

Papp played for Hungary in the European Team Chess Championship:
 In 2013, at fourth board in the 10th European Team Chess Championship (women) in Warsaw (+4, =2, -2),
 In 2015, at fourth board in the 11th European Team Chess Championship (women) in Reykjavik and won individual bronze medal (+5, =2, -1).

In 2010, she was awarded the FIDE Woman International Master (WIM) title and received the Woman Grandmaster (WGM) title two years later.

References

External links
 
 
 

1993 births
Living people
Sportspeople from Szeged
Hungarian people of German descent
Hungarian female chess players
Chess woman grandmasters
Chess Olympiad competitors